Bożena Nowakowska, married Świerczyńska (born 21 March 1955) is a Polish hurdler. She competed in the women's 100 metres hurdles at the 1976 Summer Olympics. She is married to Polish Olympic athlete Andrzej Świerczyński.

References

1955 births
Living people
Athletes (track and field) at the 1976 Summer Olympics
Polish female hurdlers
Olympic athletes of Poland
Athletes from Warsaw
Universiade medalists in athletics (track and field)
Universiade silver medalists for Poland